Cholet may also refer to:
 Cholet, commune of western France in the Maine-et-Loire department
 Cholet, Bolivian architectural phenomenon
 Cholet Island, island in the Wilhelm Archipelago
 Jean Cholet, French cardinal and Doctor utriusque iure
 Madame Cholet, a Womble

See also 

 Battle of Cholet (disambiguation)
 Chalet (disambiguation)
 Colet